Jorge Pacheco Areco (April 9, 1920 – July 29, 1998) was a Uruguayan politician and member of the Colorado Party. He served as President of Uruguay from December 6, 1967 to March 1, 1972.

Early political career
Pacheco joined the Colorado Party in the late 1950s, and was elected to the Chamber of Deputies in 1962.

In the government of President Óscar Gestido in 1967, Pacheco served as Vice President of Uruguay, a post which was revived when he took office, having been in abeyance for several years. Pacheco was the sixth person to hold the office of Vice President of Uruguay. The office dates from 1934, when Alfredo Navarro became Uruguay's first Vice President.

Presidential term (1967–1972) 

Jorge Pacheco, then vice president, succeeded to the presidency in December 1967 after the elected president Óscar Gestido died after a few months in office.

He immediately implemented price and wage freezes in an attempt to control inflation, and enforced a state of emergency in June 1968 to stem the resulting labour disputes. 

His administration fought the National Liberation Movement (MLN in Spanish), an urban guerrilla group also known as the Tupamaros, which had formed in 1963. The government, with Parliament's approval, imposed emergency measures from June 1968 to March 1969. 

Since Uruguay's constitution does not allow a president to run for immediate re-election, a referendum for constitutional reform was submitted to allow Pacheco to run for a second term in 1971, but it did not pass.

Post-presidential years (1972–1998) 

After leaving office, Bordaberry appointed him ambassador to Spain. Later on, President Aparicio Méndez appointed him ambassador to Switzerland and the United States. He returned to Uruguay in 1982, to fight the all-party primaries of 1982, which was the first step towards democratization after the democratic interruption of June 1973. The "Batllismo" faction of the Colorado Party led by Julio María Sanguinetti won the primaries. With this victory, the hegemony of Pacheco's faction in the party came to an end, at least, for several years.

Jorge Pacheco stood once again as presidential candidate for the Unión Colorada y Batllista in the November 1984 elections, selecting his former Deputy Defence Secretary and Secretary to the President Carlos Pirán as his running-mate. Although the Colorado Party won the elections, he lost to Sanguinetti 3 to 1 within the party.

Pacheco supported the new Colorado administration, and the UCB was represented in the cabinet. Sanguinetti designated Pacheco to be once again ambassador, this time to Paraguay. Returning from Paraguay, he accepted once again the Unión Colorada y Batllista nomination for the 1989 elections. Representative Pablo Millor was selected as his running-mate, representing an up-and-coming faction within the UCB. Pacheco once again lost, both internally to Jorge Batlle of the Batllismo faction, and the Colorado Party to the National Party.

Pacheco was part of the coalition government set up by President Luis Alberto Lacalle. Due to this, his former VP candidate Pablo Millor split from his faction, taking with him close to half of the Pachequismo's elected representatives, creating a new, independent sector within the Colorados called "Cruzada 94". The UCB was the last faction to remain in Lacalle's government, apart obviously from the President's Herrerismo.

With his health in a quite frail state, Pacheco ran once again for President, in elections in November 1994. This time his running-mate was outgoing Industry Minister (from the Lacalle administration) Eduardo Ache. Pacheco's election result was very poor, but even his marginal result was significant for the Colorado Party to narrowly defeat the National Party and electing once again Julio María Sanguinetti to the presidency.

After the 1994 elections, Pacheco retired from active politics, and only occasionally would make any public appearance. He died on July 29, 1998, being buried with presidential honours at the Central Cemetery of Montevideo.

Family background
Pacheco was born in a family with strong political ties.

His father, Manuel Pacheco, was doctor and politician. He was a distant relative of Rafael, César and Lorenzo Batlle Pacheco.

His maternal grandfather, Ricardo Areco, was an important politician at the beginning of the 20th century.

His son, Jorge Pacheco Klein, also exercised a political career as a Colorado Party deputy.

See also 

 Politics of Uruguay
 Colorado Party (Uruguay)
 Fructuoso Rivera#Later legacy
 List_of_political_families#Uruguay
 List of Uruguayan Ambassadors to the United States
 Tupamaro National Liberation Movement

References

People from Montevideo
Presidents of Uruguay
Uruguayan people of Spanish descent
Uruguayan people of Scottish descent
Vice presidents of Uruguay
Presidents of the Senate of Uruguay
Uruguayan vice-presidential candidates
Uruguayan anti-communists
1920 births
1998 deaths
Ambassadors of Uruguay to Spain
Ambassadors of Uruguay to Switzerland
Ambassadors of Uruguay to the United States
Ambassadors of Uruguay to Paraguay
Colorado Party (Uruguay) politicians
Burials at the Central Cemetery of Montevideo